Nemahil (also Romanized as Nemahīl; also known as Kamhīl, Nemhel, Neymhel, Nimāhil, Nīmeh Ḩīl, Nīmeh Hīl, Nīmhel, and Nimiil”) is a village in Khvoresh Rostam-e Jonubi Rural District, Khvoresh Rostam District, Khalkhal County, Ardabil Province, Iran. At the 2006 census, its population was 791, in 186 families.

References 

Towns and villages in Khalkhal County